Main Attraction is the eighth solo studio album by the American rock singer-songwriter and bass player Suzi Quatro. It was originally released in November 1982, and was her first and only release by the record label, Polydor. The album was recorded over a period of four months at The Studio Toppersfield, in Essex, England with the sessions starting in late 1981, and ending in early 1982. The album is generally regarded as the culmination of the smoother, more adult-oriented sound of Quatro's later work. The album is notably Quatro's only studio album not to contain any cover versions of songs by other artists. However, she did have a hand in composing each track, with the exception of the sixth track "Two Miles Out of Georgia", which was solely written by Chris Andrews. The album was her last recording of original material for four years, until she released Annie Get Your Gun – 1986 London Cast, and it was her last studio album of the 1980s and her last studio album for eight years, until she released Oh Suzi Q., in 1990.

It was released at the height of the popularity of the new wave music movement. "Heart of Stone" received some airplay on Album-oriented rock radio, and was released as a lead single from the album and became a moderate success, peaking at number 60 on the UK charts. And the title track was also released as a single, but unlike the aforementioned single it failed to chart. The album was received negatively by the majority of music critics, with most of the criticism being directed towards its musical direction being too commercial from her hard rock roots. The album went largely unnoticed by the public, being a commercial disappointment, and even missed the album charts worldwide (her first studio album to do so).

The album was re-released in 2008, and was the first of several remastered reissues by Cherry Red Records on Compact Disc. It contained the single version of "Heart of Stone" as a bonus track. Cherry Red have since released other Quatro remasters, as well as releasing her 2011 studio album, In the Spotlight.

Critical reception
In a retrospective review for AllMusic, critic Jim Allen wrote of the album "a few tracks are melodic, acoustic-based, Juice Newton-sounding tunes; a few explore new wave/electro-dance production touches; and for the faithful, there are a couple of rockers in the classic Quatro mode." And they added that "[the album is] Clearly a portrait of an artist in motion."

Track listing

Personnel
Credits are adapted from the album's liner notes.
Suzi Quatro - lead vocals, bass guitar, backing vocals
Len Tuckey - acoustic guitar, electric guitar, guitar synthesizer, backing vocals, producer
Dave Neal - drums, percussion
Chris Andrews - keyboards, backing vocals, producer
Jimmy Martin - steel guitar on "Two Miles Out of Georgia"
Wendy Roberts - backing vocals on "Heart of Stone"

References

External links

1982 albums
Suzi Quatro albums
Polydor Records albums
Cherry Red Records albums
New wave albums by American artists